Crash is an American television drama series set in Los Angeles, California that starred Dennis Hopper and Eric Roberts. It is the first original series produced by the Starz network. The network ordered a 13 episode season which premiered on October 17, 2008. The series is based on the 2004 film of the same title. It was developed for television by Glen Mazzara.  In Canada, Crash can be seen on Super Channel.  Starz ordered a second season that premiered in September 2009 before concluding in December 2009.

Production

Conception
Starz began looking to develop original television series after the success of series developed by its rivals Showtime and HBO and advertised funding and creative freedom for original programming projects. Crash is the network's first foray into original scripted drama and is based on the Academy Award-winning 2004 film of the same name. The writers of the film, Paul Haggis and Robert Moresco, were interested in developing a series based on the property. Lionsgate and Starz collaborated on developing the series for television.

Television writer and producer Glen Mazzara was brought in as an executive producer for the series. Mazzara has worked extensively as a writer and producer on The Shield and had developed new projects for the other networks including Life and Standoff.

Crew
Glen Mazzara served as the series executive producer and showrunner. The film's writers Paul Haggis and Robert Moresco and producer Bob Yari joined Mazzara as executive producers. Thomas Becker, Mark R. Harris, Tom Nunan, and Jorg Westerkamp all worked as producers or production executives on the original film project and are credited as co-executive producers on the series. Movie actor Don Cheadle, who was a star and producer of the 2004 film, is also on board as a co-executive producer.

Mazzara hired a writing staff that he felt was used to coping with edgier material. Co-executive producer and writer Frank Renzulli had previously worked on HBO drama The Sopranos. Co-executive producer and writer Ted Mann worked on HBO drama Deadwood. Producer and writer Stacy Rukeyser worked with Mazzara on Standoff. Executive story editor Chris Collins came from the recently completed HBO drama The Wire. Executive story editor Randy Huggins had previously worked with Mazzara on The Shield.

The pilot episode was directed by Sanford Bookstaver.

Cast
The first season starred:
Dennis Hopper as record producer Ben Cendars
Ross McCall as police officer Kenny Battaglia
Arlene Tur as actress-turned-police officer partner Bebe Arcel
Clare Carey as Brentwood mother Christine Emory
D. B. Sweeney as Peter Emory, her real-estate developer husband
Brian Tee as former gang member-turned-EMT Eddie Choi
Jocko Sims as street-smart driver Anthony Adams
Luis Chávez as undocumented Guatemalan immigrant Cesar Uman
Moran Atias as Inez
Nick E. Tarabay as a detective Axel Finet
Trilby Glover as his wife Ann Finet
Tom Sizemore as Detective Adrian Cooper.

In season 2 new cast members: 
Eric Roberts as billionaire Seth Blanchard, 
Dana Ashbrook as LA crook Jimmy, 
Linda Park as Blanchard's wife and children's author Maggie, and 
Jake McLaughlin a  former high school pitching ace now working for his diabetic mom (Tess Harper) in a hobby store.

Battaglia is a security guard and then begins working for Blanchard and some of the cast members from season 1, Tur, Carey, Sweeney, Tee, Chavez, Tarabay and Sizemore do not return for season 2. Jenny Mollen plays Tess, the new girlfriend to Kenny Battaglia.

Episodes

Season 1 (2008–09)

Season 2 (2009)

Reception 
Reviews of the series have been mixed: Ginia Bellafante of The New York Times said "The show is hardly the most original depiction of Los Angeles, but has a noirish appeal, and ambitions to tell a big story". On the other hand, Variety's Brian Lowry wrote: "There's not a whit of originality to it," and "The show possesses less substance than a brisk Santa Ana wind." According to Matthew Gilbert of The Boston Globe, "None of the stories or characters is remotely interesting".

Home media
The first season of Crash was released on DVD in the USA on September 15, 2009. The second season was released through Amazon.com on September 15, 2010.

References

External links
 

2000s American drama television series
2008 American television series debuts
2009 American television series endings
Serial drama television series
Live action television shows based on films
Television shows set in Los Angeles
Starz original programming
English-language television shows
Television series by Lionsgate Television
Television shows filmed in New Mexico